Blockton is a city in Taylor County, Iowa, United States. The population was 125 at the 2020 census.

History
Blockton was founded by the Mormons in 1861, and it was originally known as Mormontown. After the Mormons left the area, the Chicago Great Western Railway was built through the town and it was renamed Blockton in honor of W. T. Block, a railroad official.

Geography
Blockton's longitude and latitude coordinates in decimal form are 40.615851, -94.476654. The city is located along the Platte River.

Demographics

2010 census
At the 2010 census there were 192 people, 86 households, and 53 families living in the city. The racial makeup of the city was 99.5% White and 0.5% Native American. Hispanic or Latino of any race were 2.1%.

Of the 86 households 23.3% had children under the age of 18 living with them, 54.7% were married couples living together, 3.5% had a female householder with no husband present, 3.5% had a male householder with no wife present, and 38.4% were non-families. 32.6% of households were one person and 18.6% were one person aged 65 or older. The average household size was 2.23 and the average family size was 2.85.

The median age was 43.7 years. 21.9% of residents were under the age of 18; 7.4% were between the ages of 18 and 24; 21.9% were from 25 to 44; 28.6% were from 45 to 64; and 20.3% were 65 or older. The gender makeup of the city was 54.7% male and 45.3% female.

2000 census
At the 2000 census there were 192 people, 91 households, and 52 families living in the city. The racial makeup of the city was 98.96% White, and 1.04% from two or more races. Hispanic or Latino of any race were 0.52%.

Of the 91 households 28.6% had children under the age of 18 living with them, 48.4% were married couples living together, 9.9% had a female householder with no husband present, and 41.8% were non-families. 36.3% of households were one person and 24.2% were one person aged 65 or older. The average household size was 2.11 and the average family size was 2.75.

The age distribution was 22.9% under the age of 18, 9.4% from 18 to 24, 25.0% from 25 to 44, 21.4% from 45 to 64, and 21.4% 65 or older. The median age was 40 years. For every 100 females, there were 82.9 males. For every 100 females age 18 and over, there were 82.7 males.

The median household income was $22,917 and the median family income  was $28,125. Males had a median income of $25,417 versus $15,000 for females. The per capita income for the city was $15,413. About 12.7% of families and 20.0% of the population were below the poverty line, including 33.9% of those under the age of eighteen and 20.5% of those sixty five or over.

Education
Blockton is within the Bedford Community School District.

Notable people

 Bourke B. Hickenlooper (1896–1971), lieutenant governor, then 29th Governor of Iowa and four-term U.S. Senator.
 Eldon Stroburg (born 1927), former state representative and farmer

References

External links

Cities in Iowa
Cities in Taylor County, Iowa
1861 establishments in Iowa